Brechin Cathedral dates from the 13th century. As a congregation of the Church of Scotland, which is Presbyterian, the church is not technically a cathedral, in spite of its name.

It is in the Pointed style, but suffered maltreatment in 1806 at the hands of restorers, whose work was subsequently removed during the restoration completed in 1902. The western gable with its flamboyant window, Gothic door and massive square tower, parts of the (much truncated) choir, and the nave pillars and clerestory are all that is left of the original edifice. The modern stained glass in the chancel is reckoned amongst the finest in Scotland.

The cathedral is a category A listed building and the attached Round Tower is a scheduled monument.

Round Tower
Immediately adjoining the cathedral to the southwest stands the Round Tower, built about A.D. 1000. It is 86 ft.(26.21 m) high, has at the base a circumference of 50 ft.(15.3 m) and a diameter of 16 ft.(4.9 m), and is capped with a hexagonal spire of 18 ft.(5.5 m), added in the 14th century.  This type of structure is somewhat common in Ireland, but the only Scottish examples are those at Brechin and Abernethy in Perthshire.

The quality of the masonry is superior to all but a very few of the Irish examples.  The narrow single doorway, raised some feet above ground level in a manner common in these buildings, is also exceptionally fine.  The door-surround is enriched with two bands of pellets, and the monolithic arch has a well-preserved representation of the Crucifixion.  The slightly splayed sides of the doorway (also monolithic) have relief sculptures of ecclesiastics, one of them holding a crosier, the other a Tau-shaped staff.

Two monuments preserved within the cathedral, the so-called 'Brechin hogback', and a cross-slab, 'St. Mary's Stone' are further rare and important examples of Scottish 11th century stone sculpture.  The hogback combines Celtic and Scandinavian motifs, and is the most complex known stone sculpture in the Ringerike style in Scotland.  The inscribed St Mary's Stone has a circular border round the central motif of the Virgin and Child which echoes that on the Round Tower.

Present 
Between 1999 and 2009, Scott Rennie was minister of Brechin Cathedral.

In February 2020, the Presbytery of Angus agreed to a dissolution motion, under which ownership of Brechin Cathedral transferred to the General Trustees of the Church of Scotland, who would shut down and sell the building. Nonetheless, the Brechin 2020 committee planned to mark the 800th anniversary of the cathedral on 7 June 2020. In the event this proved impossible due to Covid restrictions.

The Cathedral closed its doors for the final time at a special service on 28 November 2021.

See also
Bishop of Brechin
Brechin

References

 Brechin Cathedral and Round Tower, Lumina Technologies, July, 2005

External links

 Brechin Cathedral
 Brechin Cathedral Round Tower
 Brechin Round Tower
 Brechin Cathedral WebSite

Medieval cathedrals in Scotland
Cathedrals of the Church of Scotland
Church of Scotland churches in Scotland
Scheduled Ancient Monuments in Angus
Category A listed buildings in Angus, Scotland
Listed cathedrals in Scotland
Protestant churches converted from Roman Catholicism
History of Angus, Scotland
Tourist attractions in Angus, Scotland
Culdees
Cathedral
Towers in Scotland